is a swimming venue in Akita, Akita, Japan. An Olympic competitor, Hiroko Nagasaki is the honorary director. It hosted the 2001 World Games, and it is the largest swimming pool in the prefecture.

Events
2001 World Games - Lifesaving and Finswimming
National Sports Festival of Japan (2007)

Aquatic timing system
Seiko timing system

Closing days
The third Monday
December 29-January 1, January 20-February 3

Gallery

Other swimming pools in Akita City

Other swimming pools in Akita prefecture

Defunct swimming pools in Akita prefecture

References

External links
Home page

Buildings and structures completed in 2001
Sports venues completed in 2001
Sports venues in Akita Prefecture
Swimming venues in Japan
2001 World Games
Buildings and structures in Akita (city)